Riverview Community High School (RCHS) is a public high school in Riverview, Michigan, United States. It is a current member of the Huron League. The school is a part of the Riverview Community School District. The school's mascot is the Pirates.

Notable alumni

 Lloyd Carr - former University of Michigan head football coach
 Bob Guiney - known for his role on The Bachelor
 Bill McCartney  - former University of Colorado head football coach
 Robert Teet - Wrestler, member of the U.S. Wrestling team
 Woody Widenhofer - former Pittsburgh Steelers assistant football coach and former collegiate head coach
 Brad Stewart - former contestant on the USA Network television show The Selection USA

References

Schools in Wayne County, Michigan
Public high schools in Michigan